Honam Rural District is a rural district (dehestan) in the Central District of Selseleh County, Lorestan Province, Iran. At the 2006 census, its population was 6,788, in 1,504 families.  The rural district has 57 villages.

References 

Rural Districts of Lorestan Province
Selseleh County